Aleksandras Ambrazevičius (born 15 October 1953) is a Lithuanian politician, born in Olyokminsk, Yakut ASSR. In 1990 he was among those who signed the Act of the Re-Establishment of the State of Lithuania.

References
 Biography

1953 births
Living people
People from Olyokminsky District
Lithuanian politicians
Kaunas University of Technology alumni
Signatories of the Act of the Re-Establishment of the State of Lithuania